In academia a predoctoral fellow is a person combining study for a doctorate with some form of paid research or work, in other words a paid doctoral student.  The term is only used in some parts of the world.

Europe (EU)
Across EU, typically a pre-doctoral fellow is somebody already registered in a PhD program at a host university to work together with a full professor in a certain topic of research. Upon completion of the research work and other requirements (e.g. graduate courses/exams, see: all but dissertation), the pre-doctoral fellow can submit the thesis to the doctoral committee for review and upon passing the review is asked to defend the thesis in a public presentation for conferral of PhD degree.

North America (USA/Canada)
In the USA a predoctoral fellow (pre-doc) is a researcher who has a master's degree (or equivalent university graduate education), but not a doctorate, but is enrolled in a preparatory program at university for admission to PhD (doctoral degree program) and often granted a stipend. As the name implies, predoctoral fellows often use their time as a fellow to develop their skills and résumé before applying to graduate school for a doctoral degree. They differ from other research employees (research associates) in that they primarily pursue research, rather than maintain the day-to-day function of a research facility, and may have external funding to support their research or educational activities, but typically are also reliant on the support of a research mentor whose lab they work in. 

Predocs also refer to predoctoral (that is, before Ph.D.) research positions held at universities and research institutions as a transition, to doctoral studies. In recent times, for instance, the path to a PhD in Economics and Business often contemplates a period of research assistantship for faculty or researchers at universities and research institutions. Such predoc research assistantship programs are available at many universities, business schools, and research institutions.

References

Educational stages